Scopula vicina is a moth of the family Geometridae. It is found in the north-eastern Himalaya, China, the Moluccas and Malaysia.

References

Moths described in 1907
vicina
Moths of Asia